Dainier Christian Peró Justiz (born 1 October 1999) is a Cuban professional boxer. As an amateur, Peró won gold medals at both the 2019 Pan American Games and 2016 Youth World Championships. Peró also competed at the 2020 Olympics.

Amateur career

Olympic Games result
Tokyo 2020
 Round of 16: Defeated Cristian Salcedo (Colombia) 5–0
 Quarter-finals: Defeated by Richard Torrez (USA) 4–1

Pan American Games result
Lima 2019
 Quarter-finals: Defeated Cosme dos Santos (Brazil) 5–0
 Semi–finals: Defeated Richard Torrez (USA) 3–2
 Final: Defeated Cristian Salcedo (Colombia) 4–1

Professional career

Early career
Peró made his professional debut on 2 December 2022, in a bout against Deane Williams. Peró secured a win after knocking his opponent out in the opening round of the bout.

Professional boxing record

References

External links
 Dainier Pero at AIBA

1999 births
Living people
Cuban male boxers
Boxers at the 2020 Summer Olympics
Olympic boxers of Cuba
Pan American Games gold medalists for Cuba
Pan American Games medalists in boxing
Boxers at the 2019 Pan American Games
Medalists at the 2019 Pan American Games
21st-century Cuban people